Enno Mõts (born 14 October 1974 in Tartu) is an Estonian brigadier general and the current Chief of Staff of the Headquarters of the Estonian Defence Forces.

Biography 
He was born on 14 October 1974 in Tartu. He graduated from the Pühajärvi Primary School in 1989 and Puka Middle School in 1992. He graduated in 1996 from the Estonian National Defense Academy. After serving in leadership positions in the Estonian Land Forces, in 2011, he graduated the University of Tartu. The next year, he became Commander of the Northeast Defense District, and in 2014, headed the Southern Defense District. In 2016, he became the head of Estonian Military Academy. Since 2021, he had been Chief of Staff of the Headquarters of the Estonian Defence Forces.

Awards 

 Defense Forces Long Service Medal (2018)
 Order of the Cross of the Eagle, III class (2019)
 Medal of Merit of the Baltic Defense College (2019)

References

Living people
1974 births
Estonian brigadier generals
University of Tartu alumni
Recipients of the Military Order of the Cross of the Eagle, Class III